David Mukuna-Trouet (born 2 October 2001) is a Belgian professional footballer who plays as a forward for Jong Gent.

Career
Mukuna-Trouet made his professional debut with Beerschot in a 6–3 Belgian First Division A win over Sint-Truidense on 17 October 2020.

On 12 April 2022, Mukuna-Trouet signed with Gent. For the 2022–23 season, he was assigned to the reserve squad Jong Gent which plays in the third-tier Belgian National Division 1.

Personal life
Mukuna-Trouet is the grandson of the pioneer footballer Léon Mokuna, who was one of the first African footballers to play in Europe.

References

External links
 
 
 JPL Profile

2001 births
Belgian people of Democratic Republic of the Congo descent
People from Verviers
Footballers from Liège Province
Living people
Belgian footballers
Association football forwards
K Beerschot VA players
K.A.A. Gent players
Belgian Pro League players
Belgian National Division 1 players